The Chicago Council on Global Affairs is a global affairs think tank, describing itself as "a nonpartisan, nonprofit organization dedicated to increasing knowledge and engagement in global affairs and empowering more people to help shape our global future." The organization is based in the Chicago Loop at Two Prudential Plaza.

History 

The Council was formed on February 20, 1922. Originally named The Chicago Council on Foreign Relations, the organization was established as a neutral forum for discussing foreign affairs during a period of isolationism in the United States after World War I.

Adlai Stevenson served as president of The Chicago Council from 1935 to 1937. The Council launched World Spotlight in 1955, a weekly television series airing on WTTW. The series aired for about 5 years and featured Council Director Carter Davidson and guests, who discussed world events. In 1971, John E. Rielly became executive director of the Council, and in 1974, became president, serving the leadership position until 2001. Under Rielly, the Council began releasing annual surveys of American public opinion on United States foreign policy.

In September 2006, the Council changed its name from the Chicago Council on Foreign Relations to the Chicago Council on Global Affairs. Former United States NATO Ambassador Ivo Daalder became president of the Council in July 2013. In 2016 it was ranked No. 1 "Think Tank to Watch" by the University of Pennsylvania's Think Tank and Civil Societies Program.

Events 
The Council hosts public events with international speakers, policymakers, business executives, journalists, and other experts. In 2014–15, the Council disclosed that it held more than 200 public and private programs with approximately 41,600 attendees in person and online.

Notable speakers at the Council have included Eleanor Roosevelt, Margaret Thatcher, Mikhail Gorbachev, Viktor Yushchenko, Tony Blair, Ellen Johnson Sirleaf, King Abdullah II, Jon Stewart, Ben Bernanke, Tim Geithner, Robert Gates, Janet Yellen, and Hillary Clinton. Several past or current United States presidents have also spoken at the Council, including Gerald Ford, Jimmy Carter, Ronald Reagan, and Barack Obama.

In May 2015, the Council partnered with the Financial Times to host the Chicago Forum on Global Cities, a three-day international event exploring how global cities can address issues like education, inequality, security, and climate change.

The Council also hosts an annual Global Food Security Symposium, which it says is focused on the United States government's and international community's progress on addressing the problem of food insecurity. The event has drawn speakers such as Hillary Clinton, Barack Obama, and USAID administrator Rajiv Shah.

Research 
The Chicago Council on Global Affairs conducts research on food and agriculture, global cities, economics, energy, immigration, security, public opinion, and water. Among its recent publications, the Council released reports for initiatives in global hunger and arming Ukraine. According to Rajiv Shah, the Council's 2009 report, "Renewing American Leadership in the Fight Against Global Hunger and Poverty," served as a "road map" for the U.S. government's Feed the Future.

In February 2015, the Council partnered with the Brookings Institution and the Atlantic Council to produce "Preserving Ukraine's Independence, Resisting Russian Aggression: What the United States and NATO Must Do" a report urging the United States and NATO to provide lethal defensive assistance to preserve Ukraine's independence.

In March 2017, the Council released a report showing that immigration accounted for a large share of the population growth in the Midwest. In Chicago and Akron, immigrants accounted for more than half of the population growth. In the metropolitan areas of Cincinnati, Milwaukee and Minneapolis, they accounted for at least a quarter of the population growth. In some Midwestern cities and towns, immigrants are staving off population decline.

Funding 
The Chicago Council is funded through individual membership contributions, corporate memberships, and foundation grants. In the 2015 fiscal year, the Council took in $7.5 million from individuals, $7.8 million from corporations, and $2.4 million from foundations.

References

External links
 

1922 establishments in Illinois
Non-profit organizations based in Chicago
Global policy organizations
Foreign policy and strategy think tanks in the United States
Think tanks based in the United States